Mariusz Kamiński (born 25 September 1965 in Sochaczew) is a Polish politician who served as the head of the Central Anticorruption Bureau (CBA) from August 2006 to October 2009. Since 14 August 2019, he has served as the Minister of the Interior and Administration, in addition to coordinating Polish secret services, which he had done previously as a minister without portfolio.

Career

He had previously been a member of the Sejm, elected on 25 September 2005, getting 9142 votes in 19 Warsaw district, as a candidate on the Law and Justice list. He was also a member of Sejm 1997-2001 and Sejm 2001-2005. Kamiński was dismissed (as the head of CBA) on 13 October 2009 by prime minister Donald Tusk.

Kamiński was sentenced to three years in prison for abuse of power in March 2015 but had appealed. After the 2015 Polish parliamentary election the Polish President Andrzej Duda pardoned Kamiński, the President's spokesmen argued that people who fight corruption "deserve special protection." In March 2016, the appeal court while examining the appeals raised during the case, in regards to the decision above of the President, annulled the judgement and discontinued the proceedings. On 31 May 2017 the Supreme Court, in an adopted resolution, recognised that pardon as ineffective. Despite the opinion of European Commission, CJEU, Venice Commission, Association of Polish Judges "Iustitia" and the United States Department of State, Polish Constitutional Tribunal ruled (with the one dissenting opinion) that the constitutional right of grace as a concept broader than pardon also includes acts of individual abolition. Afterwards, Kamiński became the head of the secret services as a minister without portfolio.

Personal life
Kamiński is strongly opposed to Communism. He is also one of the few members of the conservative Law and Justice Party who is publicly an atheist.

Awards
Commander's Cross of the Order of Polonia Restituta

See also
Members of Polish Sejm 2005-2007

References 

 https://www.gov.pl/web/gov/mariusz-kaminski

External links
Mariusz Kamiński - parliamentary page - includes declarations of interest, voting record, and transcripts of speeches.

1965 births
Living people
People from Sochaczew
Members of the Polish Sejm 1997–2001
Members of the Polish Sejm 2001–2005
Members of the Polish Sejm 2005–2007
Members of the Polish Sejm 2007–2011
Members of the Polish Sejm 2011–2015
Members of the Polish Sejm 2015–2019
Members of the Polish Sejm 2019–2023
Government ministers of Poland
Law and Justice politicians
Commanders of the Order of Polonia Restituta
Polish politicians convicted of crimes
20th-century Polish criminals
21st-century Polish criminals
Polish atheists
Polish anti-communists